AGCO Corporation is an American agricultural machinery manufacturer headquartered in Duluth, Georgia, United States.  It was founded in 1990.  AGCO designs, produces and sells tractors, combines, foragers, hay tools, self-propelled sprayers, smart farming technologies, seeding equipment, and tillage equipment.

History

AGCO was established on June 20, 1990 when Robert J. Ratliff, John M. Shumejda, Edward R. Swingle, and James M. Seaver, who were executives at Deutz-Allis, bought out Deutz-Allis North American operations from the parent corporation Klöckner-Humboldt-Deutz AG (KHD), a German company which owned the Deutz-Fahr brand of agriculture equipment. KHD had purchased portions of the Allis-Chalmers agricultural equipment business five years earlier. After the organization of the company, Robert Ratliff was selected to be the company's first chairman.

The company was called Gleaner-Allis Corporation, then the name was changed to Allis-Gleaner Corporation, or AGCO. The Deutz-Allis line of tractors was renamed AGCO-Allis, and Gleaner became a brand of its own for combines. The Deutz-Allis brand continued in South America until 2001, when it was renamed AGCO-Allis. In 2001, AGCO Allis was renamed AGCO in North America.

In March 1991, AGCO purchased the Hesston Corporation which is in Hesston, Kansas gaining hay and forage equipment as well as technologies such as the grain auger, invented in 1947 by Lyle Yost. Hesston had a 50 percent joint venture with Case International, now a part of CNH Global. AGCO purchased the White Tractor line from the Allied Corporation's White-New Idea company. In 1993, AGCO purchased the remainder of White-New Idea, a manufacturer of New Idea hay equipment, manure spreaders, and White planters with a large manufacturing plant in Coldwater, Ohio.

Also in 1993, AGCO purchased the North American distribution rights to Massey Ferguson, a worldwide agricultural equipment company. In 1994, they purchased McConnell Tractors, manufacturer of the large articulated Massey Ferguson tractors. AGCO developed the Agcostar line of articulated tractors. Later in 1994, the Black Machine line of planters was purchased.

In 1995 AgEquipment Group was bought; it manufactured tillage equipment and loaders under the Glenco, Tye and Farmhand brands. In 1996, acquisitions went international with the purchase of Iochpe-Maxion in Brazil. It was the Brazilian company which had rights to the Massey Ferguson brand and manufacturing in the region, as well as the Maxion brand of industrial equipment. In the same year AGCO purchased Deutz Argentina, the number one leader of tractors in Argentina. Also in 1996, AGCO purchased Western Combine Corporation and Portage Manufacturing in Canada. Western Combine had previously purchased the assets of the Massey Combine Corporation's combine operation, which had been spun off by Massey Ferguson.

In 1997 the company purchased Fendt which is based in Germany, the German tractor company. Fendt is well known for its advanced technology and superior manufacturing quality. The acquisition of Fendt was contingent on three conditions; 1) The Fendt name would be retained, 2) The factory in Marktoberdorf would continue to operate, and 3) a fair price would be paid for the company. Also in 1997, AGCO acquired Dronningborg Industries in Denmark, the manufacturer of European Massey Ferguson combines, and former manufacturer of Dronningborg combines.

In 1998, AGCO made a joint venture with Deutz AG to produce engines in Argentina, and purchased the Spra-Coupe and Willmar companies. Spra-Coupe and Willmar are sprayer companies in North America. SpraCoupe originated in Bismarck, North Dakota. After being purchased by AGCO, the manufacturing of SpraCoupes was moved to Willmar, Minnesota where the Willmar branded fertilizer tenders and "Wrangler" articulated loaders were being manufactured. SpraCoupe and Willmar products were manufactured in Willmar from 1998 to 2001.

For the year 2000, AGCO bought out its partner CNH Global N.V. in the Hay and Forage Industries joint venture.

In 2001, AGCO purchased Ag-Chem Equipment, expanding its application equipment business.  Ag-Chem Equipment was based in Jackson, Minnesota and developed the TerraGator flotation-type and RoGator rowcrop-type applicators. Also in 2001  the SpraCoupe and Willmar brands moved their manufacturing from Willmar, Minnesota to the Jackson facility and the Agco-Allis and White tractor lines were merged in North America under the AGCO brand, continuing in the orange color.

In 2002 AGCO purchased rights to the Challenger name and the tracked tractors from the Caterpillar Corporation, giving the firm a well-known brand name and high-power tracked tractors.   The firm further developed the Challenger line into: wheeled tractors, using tractors manufactured by Iseki, Agritalia, the Massey Ferguson factory and the Brazilian Valtra factory; combines, rebranding some Massey Ferguson/Gleaner -built combines; and hay equipment, using Hesston-built hay equipment.  AGCO also purchased the Sunflower Manufacturing Company in Beloit, Kansas which manufactures tillage, seeding, and specialty harvesting equipment.

In 2004 AGCO purchased the Valtra tractor company from the Kone Group, in Finland. Valtra had licensing agreements with the Eicher company in India for tractor production, and also with the HEMA group in Turkey. The purchase of Valtra also included SISU Diesel engines. Since 2012 this Finland based diesel engine manufacturer with production for example in Brazil has operated with name AGCO Power.

2006 saw a re-focusing of the various brands and subsidiaries, and the reduction of individual brands. AGCO announced plans to combine some, and make some only part of a larger brand, or co-branding. Examples include the Massey Ferguson 9635 Hesston self-propelled swather, and the AGCO 9365 Hesston self-propelled swather. Challenger has seen further expansion with the further consolidation of the AgChem brand into Challenger, and the introduction of Agritalia built tractors and an articulated Challenger tractor. In August of 2006, AGCO saw its first change in the position of chairman since its founding with the selection of Martin Richenhagen to succeed Robert Ratliff.

In 2007, AGCO bought 50% of Laverda S.p.A. from ARGO SpA, which included the Gallagnani and Fella-Werke hay equipment brands.

In 2008/2009 AGCO, the Challenger, Valtra, and Massey Ferguson large row crop tractors were launched in Europe and North America respectively with AGCO's e3 Selective Catalytic Reduction (SCR) emission reduction technology.

Late in 2009, the firm announced that it would phase out orange AGCO tractors by 2011.

In late 2010, the firm announced the plan to acquire the remaining 50% of Laverda, which included Fella-Werke as well. The acquisition was finalized in March 2011.

The expansion was completed in 2012.

In 2011, the firm said that it will invest $40 million in its Hesston, Kansas plant with a new  painting and finishing building.  Construction began June 2011 and was completed in 2013.

In October 2011, AGCO purchased GSI, based in Assumption, Illinois, a manufacturer of grain storage and handling equipment.

In 2012. AGCO acquired 60% of Santal Equipamentos, a sugar cane planting and harvesting equipment. It also purchased 80% of Shandong Dafeng Machinery Co, a combine harvester manufacturer in China. AGCO formed the Algerian Tractors Company joint venture with the Algerian brand Etrag with 49% ownership.

In 2013, GSI acquired Johnson System, based in Marshall, Michigan, a manufacturer of catwalks and towers. In 2013, AGCO started Fuse Technologies, a smart farming technology division.

In 2017, AGCO acquired Precision Planting, based in Tremont, Illinois, a planting equipment and technology business.

In 2017, AGCO acquired the forage machinery line from Lely, including balers, loading wagons, mowers, tedders, rakes, and the rights to the entire portfolio of the defunct Mengele Agrartechnik. This included factories in Wolfenbuettel (D) and Waldstetten (D).  The factory in Maassluis (NL) will be closed in 2018.

In September 2020, AGCO acquired 151 Research Inc., a Winnipeg, Manitoba based company that specializes in grain storage research and development.

On January 1, 2021, AGCO named the third chairman in its history with the selection of Eric Hansotia to succeed the retiring Martin Richenhagen after a near 15-year tenure as head of the company.

In August 2021, Precision Planting acquired Headsight, a Bremen, Indiana company specializing in precision agriculture harvesting solutions.

In September 2021, AGCO acquired Faromatics (Farm Robotics and Automation), a precision livestock farming business.

In December 2021, Precision Planting announced an agreement to acquire Creative Sites Media, a software and app development company. Also acquired in December 2021 by AGCO was Appareo Systems, a software engineering, hardware development and electronic manufacturing company.

In May 2022, AGCO acquired JCA Industries, a Winnipeg, Manitoba based company specializing in autonomous software for agricultural machines, implement controls and electronic system components.

Manufacturing Sites 

Current

Former
 Coldwater, Ohio, USA : White-New Idea farm equipment in 1999
 Independence, Missouri, USA : Gleaner combines in 2000
 Willmar, Minnesota, USA: Spra-Coupe and Willmar application equipment in 2001
 Banner Lane, Coventry, UK : Massey Ferguson tractors in 2003
 Maassluis, Netherlands : Lely hay equipment in 2018

Brands 

 AGCO Power
 Challenger
 Fendt
 Gleaner
 GSI
 Massey Ferguson
 Precision Planting
 RoGator / TerraGator
 Sunflower Manufacturing
 Valtra
 White Farm Equipment
 Laverda
 Fella

See also

 List of S&P 400 companies

References

Further reading
 Factory on the Plains: Lyle Yost and the Hesston Corporation; Billy Mac Jones; Wichita State University; 1987; ASIN B0006EQOU0.

External links

 
Agricultural machinery manufacturers of the United States
Tractor manufacturers of the United States
Manufacturing companies established in 1990
Manufacturing companies based in Georgia (U.S. state)
Companies based in Duluth, Georgia
Harvey County, Kansas
Companies listed on the New York Stock Exchange
Companies formed by management buyout
Diesel engine manufacturers
Electrical generation engine manufacturers
Marine engine manufacturers